Cynocephalus may refer to;

 Cynocephaly, a Greek word, literally meaning "dog-head", for a number of mythical creatures with the heads or faces of dogs
 Philippine flying lemur (Cynocephalus volans), one of two species of flying lemurs
 Yellow baboon (Papio cynocephalus), a baboon from the Old World monkey family
 Kinda baboon (Papio cynocephalus kindae), a subspecies of baboon
 Thylacine (Thylacinus cynocephalus), commonly known as the Tasmanian tiger
 Rainette nébuleuse (Scinax cynocephalus), a species of frog in the family Hylidae